Leitch's Station was the first settlement in Campbell County, Kentucky, USA, now the City of Wilder, Kentucky on the Licking River. It was located six miles south of the mouth of the Licking and was named for Major David Leitch (1753-1794), who was given the land for his service in the American Revolutionary War. David Leitch was Aide-de-Camp to General Lawson during that War. Leitch died at age 41. His young widow, Ketura Moss Leitch married General James Taylor Jr. The marriage united the two largest landholders in the area, who together owned most of what is known today as Newport, Bellevue, Southgate, Wilder, Fort Thomas, Highland Heights, Cold Spring, and Alexandria.

References

Geography of Campbell County, Kentucky
History of Kentucky